The Zimbabwe women's cricket team were scheduled to tour Namibia between 24 January and 2 February 2021 to play a five-match Women's Twenty20 International (WT20I) series and two 50-over games. The venue for all of the matches was to be the United Ground in Windhoek.

As a result of the COVID-19 pandemic, the Namibian women's team had not played an international fixture since the Women's World Twenty20 Qualifier in September 2019 – a tournament that they had participated in following the International Cricket Council's suspension of Zimbabwe. Zimbabwe's most recent matches were at the African qualifier event in May 2019.

On 7 January 2021, Cricket Namibia announced that the series had been postponed due to COVID-19 lockdown regulations in the country.

Squads

WT20I series

1st WT20I

2nd WT20I

3rd WT20I

4th WT20I

5th WT20I

50-Over series

1st 50-Over match

2nd 50-Over match

References

External links

Cricket in Namibia
Cricket in Zimbabwe
Associate international cricket competitions in 2020–21
Cricket events postponed due to the COVID-19 pandemic